Morisset railway station is located on the Main Northern line in New South Wales, Australia. It serves the City of Lake Macquarie suburb of Morisset opening on 15 August 1887 as Morrisset being renamed on 1 February 1889.

Platforms & services
Morisset has two side platforms. It is serviced by NSW TrainLink Central Coast & Newcastle Line services travelling from Sydney Central to Newcastle. Until October 2013 it was the terminating point for many local services from the old Newcastle station, however these now all continue to Gosford and Sydney.

The remnants of the former freight yard are immediately north of the station including a southbound refuge loop.

Transport links
Busways operate one route to and from Morisset station:
95: to Lake Haven via Gwandalan & Mannering Park (Weekdays only) 

Hunter Valley Buses operate five routes via Morisset station:
275: to Toronto via Wangi Wangi
278: to Silverwater
279: to Sunshine
280: to Cooranbong
281: from Lake Haven to Wangi Wangi (Fridays only)

Rover Coaches operate one route twice daily to and from Morisset station:
163: to Cessnock via Kurri Kurri

References

External links

Morisset station details Transport for New South Wales

Easy Access railway stations in New South Wales
Railway stations in the Hunter Region
Railway stations in Australia opened in 1887
Regional railway stations in New South Wales
Short-platform railway stations in New South Wales, 4 cars
Main North railway line, New South Wales
City of Lake Macquarie